RedFlagDeals.com is a Canadian bargain hunting and coupon website owned by VerticalScope (majority owned by Torstar). As of March 2021, an estimated 5.7 million or more visitors per month use the website and there are over 1.2 million registered users.

History

In November 2000, RedFlagDeals.com was started with the founding of Clear Sky Media by Derek Szeto. Since then, RedFlagDeals.com has become one of the largest Canadian bargain-hunting websites.

In February 2010, Yellow Pages Group acquired the company for $9,750,000 worth of preferred shares.

In August 2018, the company was purchased by VerticalScope, a Toronto-based operator of online communities, who is owned by Torstar.

Forums

The RedFlagDeals.com forums is ranked #173 on the list of biggest message boards on the Internet. Some notable sub-forums include the Hot Deals, Freebies, and Contests forums.

Forums statistics :
 Members: 1,276,302
 Threads: 1,827,173
 Posts: 28,417,137

See also

 List of Internet forums
 Internet forum

References

External links
 

Online retailers of Canada